Loïc Guguen (29 July 1972 – 20 January 2023) was a contemporary French dramatic baritone.

Biography 
Guguen studied with Rachel Yakar and in London with Laura Sarti at the "Opera Course" of the Guildhall School of Music and Drama from which he graduated in March 2006. He began the same year in London with the title role of Simon Boccanegra by Giuseppe Verdi.

Guguen died on 20 January 2023.

Career 
 Opera
 Ford (Falstaff by Giuseppe Verdi) in London, under the direction of 
 Don Cassandro (La Finta Semplice by Wolfgang Amadeus Mozart)
 The sculptor monk (Le Jongleur de Notre-Dame by Jules Massenet) in Metz
 Germont (La traviata by Giuseppe Verdi) and Sharpless in (Madame Butterfly by Giacomo Puccini) at the Besançon opera,
 Renato (Un ballo in maschera by Giuseppe Verdi), in Northern Ireland
 Valentin (Faust by Charles Gounod) in Edinburgh
 The Director and Presto (Les Mamelles de Tirésias by Francis Poulenc) at the Feldkirch festival in Austria,
 Marcello (La Bohème by Giacomo Puccini) at the Metz opera,

 Oratorio
 St Matthew Passion by Johann Sebastian Bach (Pilate) under the direction of John Nelson
 L'Enfance du Christ by Hector Berlioz (Polydorus)
 Messa da requiem by Giuseppe Verdi with the Orchestre Colonne

References

External links 
 Loïc Guguen on Opera musica

Year of birth missing
20th-century births
2023 deaths
French operatic baritones